Seth Padelford (October 3, 1807 – August 26, 1878) was the 31st Governor of Rhode Island from 1869 to 1873.

Biography 
Padelford was born in Taunton, Massachusetts. He worked as a grocer, as well as serving on the City Council of Providence, Rhode Island, the Providence School Committee and in the Rhode Island House of Representatives.

Padelford was a Unitarian and an ardent abolitionist with ties to the New England Emigrant Aid Company, which armed and organized settlers who took part in the "Bleeding Kansas" conflict. In 1860, he was nominated as the Republican Party candidate for Governor of Rhode Island. Anti-war Republicans and textile interests joined Democrats to back the young William Sprague IV, the nephew of former Rhode Island Governor and Senator William Sprague III. Sprague, running as a "Conservative" against Padelford's "Radical" candidacy, won the election by a margin of 12,278 to 10,740 votes, with twice the customary turnout at the polls.

After the American Civil War began in 1861, Padelford won two consecutive elections for Lieutenant Governor, serving from 1863 to 1865. He was elected Governor in 1869, serving four terms before stepping down.

Padelford died in 1878 in Providence, and is buried in Swan Point Cemetery.

Family
John Peirce, step-son -  participated in the development of the telephone.

References

External links

 Biography at the National Governor's Association

1807 births
1878 deaths
School board members in Rhode Island
Republican Party members of the Rhode Island House of Representatives
Republican Party governors of Rhode Island
American abolitionists
Politicians from Taunton, Massachusetts
American Unitarians
Burials at Swan Point Cemetery
Providence City Council members
19th-century American politicians